The Iona Gaels baseball team is a varsity intercollegiate athletic team of Iona College in New Rochelle, New York, United States. The team is a member of the Metro Atlantic Athletic Conference, which is part of the National Collegiate Athletic Association's Division I. The team plays its home games at City Park in New Rochelle, New York.

Major League Baseball
Iona has had 26 Major League Baseball Draft selections since the draft began in 1965.

See also
List of NCAA Division I baseball programs

References

External links